Theodor Förster (May 15, 1910 – May 20, 1974) was a German physical chemist known for theoretical work on light-matter interaction in molecular systems such as fluorescence and resonant energy transfer.

Education and career 
Förster studied at the University of Frankfurt and received his Ph.D. at the age of only 23 under Erwin Madelung in 1933. In the same year he joined the Nazi Party and the SA. He then joined Karl-Friedrich Bonhoeffer as a research assistant at the Leipzig University, where he worked closely with Peter Debye, Werner Heisenberg, and Hans Kautzky. Förster obtained his habilitation in 1940 and became a lecturer at the Leipzig University. Following his research and teaching activities in Leipzig, he became a professor at the Poznań University in occupied Poland (1942).

From 1947 to 1951 he worked at the Max Planck Institute for Physical Chemistry in Göttingen as a department head. In 1951, he became a professor at the University of Stuttgart. He passed away due to a heart attack in 1974.

Research 
Among Förster's greatest achievements is his contribution to the understanding of FRET (Förster resonance energy transfer). The term Förster radius, which is related to the FRET phenomenon, is named after him. He also proposed the Förster cycle to predict the acid dissociation constant of a photoacid. He also discovered excimer formation in solutions of pyrene.

Work

Book
 Förster, Theodor: Fluoreszenz organischer Verbindungen. Göttingen: Vandenhoeck & Ruprecht, 1950. – Unveränd. Nachdr. d. 1. Aufl., im Literaturverz. erg. um spätere Veröff. d. Autors. Göttingen: Vandenhoeck & Ruprecht, 1982 – *

Papers

Literature 
 A. Weller: Nachruf auf Theodor Förster. In: Berichte der Bunsengesellschaft für Physikalische Chemie 78 (1974) p. 969 [with Porträt].
 George Porter: Some reflections on the work of Theodor Förster. In: Die Naturwissenschaften 63 (1976) 5, p. 207–211.

References

1910 births
1974 deaths
German physical chemists
Goethe University Frankfurt alumni
Nazi Party members
Academic staff of Leipzig University
Max Planck Institutes researchers
Academic staff of the University of Stuttgart
Academic staff of Adam Mickiewicz University in Poznań
Theoretical physicists
Chemical physicists
Max Planck Institute directors